Mark Anthony Green (born March 22, 1967) is a former American football running back in the National Football League (NFL). He was a fifth round selection (130th overall pick) out of Notre Dame by the Chicago Bears in the 1989 NFL Draft.

References

1967 births
Living people
American football running backs
Chicago Bears players
Notre Dame Fighting Irish football players
Players of American football from Riverside, California